Buynuz is a village and municipality in the Ismailli Rayon of Azerbaijan.  It has a population of 597.

References 

Populated places in Ismayilli District